A fluid or water deprivation test is a medical test which can be used to determine whether the patient has diabetes insipidus as opposed to other causes of polydipsia (a condition of excessive thirst that causes an excessive intake of water). The patient is required, for a prolonged period, to forgo intake of water completely, to determine the cause of the thirst.

This test measures changes in body weight, urine output, and urine composition when fluids are withheld. Sometimes measuring blood levels of ADH (a synonym for vasopressin) during this test is also necessary.

If there is no change in the water loss despite fluid deprivation, desmopressin may be administered to distinguish between the two types of diabetes insipidus which are central & nephrogenic diabetes insipidus.

The time of deprivation may vary from 4 to 18 hours.

The serum osmolality and urine osmolality are both measured in the test.

Interpretation of WDT 
The conditions can be distinguished in the following way:

References

External links
 Water deprivation test protocol

Medical tests
Thirst
Dynamic endocrine function tests